Glastonbury 90 is a 1999 live album release of a 1990 concert by Hawkwind.

Track listing
"Black Elk Speaks" [listed as "Magic of the Earth"] (Black Elk/Brock) – 1:05
"Angels of Death" (Brock) – 6:06
"Golden Void" (Brock) – 7:13
"Brainstorm" (Turner) – 4:50
"The Door" (Wishart) – 2:57
"Ejection" (Calvert) – 5:53
"Sword of Dawn" (Hawkwind) – 5:46
"Hassan-i-Sabah" [aka "Assassins of Allah"] (Calvert/Rudolph) – 3:55
"Dream Worker" (Bainbridge) – 3:59
"You Shouldn't Do That" (Turner/Brock) – 3:58
"Images" (Wishart/Brock/Davey) – 7:10

Personnel
Bridget Wishart – vocals
Dave Brock – guitar, keyboards, vocals
Alan Davey – bass guitar, vocals
Harvey Bainbridge – keyboards, vocals
Richard Chadwick – drums

Hawkwind live albums
1999 live albums